Les Deurres railway station is a railway station in the municipality of Neuchâtel, in the Swiss canton of Neuchâtel. It is an intermediate stop on the standard gauge Neuchâtel–Le Locle-Col-des-Roches line of Swiss Federal Railways.

Services
The following services stop at Les Deurres:

References

External links 
 
 

Railway stations in the canton of Neuchâtel
Swiss Federal Railways stations
Transport in Neuchâtel